Feylinia boulengeri is a species of skink, a lizard in the family Scincidae. The species is native to Central Africa.

Description
F. boulengeri, like all species in the genus Feylinia, has no legs, and has reduced eyes and ear openings covered with skin.

Geographic range
F. boulengeri is endemic to Gabon.

Habitat

Behavior
F. boulengeri is terrestrial and fossorial.

Reproduction
The mode of reproduction of F. boulengeri is unknown.

Etymology
The specific name, boulengeri, is in honor of Belgian-born British herpetologist George Albert Boulenger.

References

Further reading
Chabanaud P (1917). "Descriptions de trois espèces nouvelles de Reptiles de l'Afrique ". Bulletin du Muséum national d'histoire naturelle, Paris 23: 219–225. (Feylinia boulengeri, new species, pp. 221–222, Figures 3–5). (in French).
de Witte G-F, Laurent RF (1943). "Contribution à la systématique des formes dégradées de la famille des Scincidae apparentées au genre Scelotes Fitzinger ". Mémoires du Musée royal d'histoire naturelle de Belgique, Series 2, 26: 1-44. (Chabanaudia, new genus). (in French).
Goin CJ, Goin OB, Zug GR (1978). Introduction to Herpetology, Third Edition. San Francisco: W.H. Freeman and Company. xi + 378 pp. . (Genus Chabanaudia, p. 303).

External links
4to40.com: Skinks

Feylinia
Skinks of Africa
Reptiles of Gabon
Endemic fauna of Gabon
Taxa named by Paul Chabanaud
Reptiles described in 1917